Escher is a surname. Notable people with the surname include:
 Alfred Escher (1819−1883), a Swiss politician and railway pioneer
 Arnold Escher von der Linth (1807−1872), a Swiss geologist
 Berend George Escher (1885−1967), a Dutch geologist, half-brother of M. C. Escher
 George Arnold Escher  (1843−1939), a Dutch civil engineer, foreign advisor to Japan, father of M. C. Escher
 Gitta Escher (born 1957), a German gymnast
 Hans Conrad Escher von der Linth (1767−1823), a Swiss scientist, civil engineer and politician
 Heinrich Escher (1626−1710), a Swiss politician, mayor of Zürich
 Josef Escher (1885−1954), a Swiss Federal Councilor
 Luiz Jeferson Escher (born 1987), Brazilian footballer
 Lydia Escher (1858−1891), a Swiss patron of the arts
 M. C. Escher (Maurits Cornelis Escher; 1898−1972), a Dutch graphic artist
 Rudolf George Escher (1912−1980), a Dutch composer and music theoretician
 Sandra Escher (born 1945), a Dutch psychiatrist

See also
 4444 Escher, an asteroid named after Maurits Cornelis Escher
 Escher Museum, containing the work of Maurits Cornelis Escher
 Escher (programming language), a declarative programming language
 Escher Wyss & Cie., a former engineering company in Switzerland
 Escher Wyss (Zürich), a borough of Zurich
 Esher (disambiguation)